The RealNetworks Community Source License (RCSL) is a software license. Developers pick this license when they do not want to open source their resultant Helix DNA-based application.  RCSL has a free R&D license and commercial terms for distribution.
 
The RCSL is used by the Helix project.

External links
Complete text of the RCSL license

 

Software licenses
Year of introduction missing
Community Source License